Laguna Beach: The Real Orange County is an American reality television series that originally aired on MTV from September 28, 2004 until November 15, 2006. The series aired three seasons and focused on the personal lives of several students attending Laguna Beach High School. Its premise was originated with Liz Gateley, while Tony DiSanto served as the executive producer.

Throughout its run, the series was led by eight (seasons 1 & 2) and nine (season 3) primary cast members, who were credited by their first names. Their storylines were largely developed by a number of supporting cast members. Its original main cast members were high school seniors Stephen Colletti, Lauren Conrad, Trey Phillips, Christina Schuller, Morgan Olsen and Lo Bosworth, and juniors Kristin Cavallari and Talan Torriero. Cavallari's friends Alex Hooser and Jessica Smith appeared as supporting cast members in the first season. Cavallari and Talan's senior year was the focus of season two, with their classmates Smith, Alex Murrel, Taylor Cole and Jason Wahler integrated into the main cast, alongside college freshmen Colletti and Conrad. Bosworth, Olsen, Phillips and Schuller returned briefly in guest roles. 

In the third season, Smith and Alex Hooser were the sole returning cast members, albeit in recurring roles. The show instead focused on a new class of Laguna Beach High students, juniors Kyndra Mayo, Cami Edwards (who appeared the previous season as sophomores), Tessa Keller, Cameron Brinkman, Rocky Donatelli, Breanna Conrad, Lexie Contursi and Chase Johnson, and senior Kelan Hurley. 

The fourth season, titled Newport Harbor: The Real Orange County, relocated the show to Newport Beach, California and featured an entirely new cast from Newport Harbor High School, including seniors Chrissy Schwartz, Allie Stockton, Sasha Dunlap and Chase Cornwell, juniors Clay Adler and Grant Newman, and sophomore Taylor Geiney.

Main cast members
  Main cast (appears in opening credits) 
  Supporting cast (3+ episodes)
  Guest cast (1–2 episodes)

Cast notes

Supporting cast members
  Supporting cast (3+ episodes)
  Guest cast (1–2 episodes)

Cast notes

References

Lists of reality show participants